Jon Carpenter is an American politician representing Missouri's 15th district in Kansas City's Northland and was elected in 2012 to the Missouri House of Representatives. Carpenter is the owner of his own marketing and advertising firm. He is also a member of the Gladstone Area Chamber of Commerce and the Northland Democratic Club.

In 2020, he ran for the Clay County Commission Western and won by a narrow margin.

Early life
Carpenter attended St. Charles grade school, and St. Charles Borromeo Catholic Church in Kansas City, Missouri. At North Kansas City High School, his hard work and determination earned him a spot as a National Merit Scholar and he received a scholarship to the University of Southern California.

While at school in Los Angeles, Carpenter interned for four-term U.S. Senator Dianne Feinstein. He served as Financial Director and later President of the USC College Democrats. He graduated magna cum laude with a degree in Political Science and a minor in International Relations.

After graduation, he returned to the state and married his wife Midori. Together, they started Carpenter Communications, a marketing and advertising firm that partners with local businesses and nonprofit organizations.

Electoral career
In 2012, Carpenter defeated Carol Suter and Shon Adamson in the Democratic primary to win the Democratic nomination. Carpenter then went on to defeat Republican Kevin Corlew by 9294 votes to 7251 votes.

In 2016, Carpenter was reelected after running unopposed in both the Democratic primary and the general election.

In 2018, Carpenter ran unopposed in the Democratic primary and went on to defeat the controversial and notoriously anti- Semitic Republican candidate Steve West by receiving 9261 votes to West's 5398 votes.

Currently, Carpenter is a candidate for Clay County Western Commissioner. He is on the ballot in the Democratic primary on August 4, 2020. According to the Kansas City Star, "[Carpenter] wants to get the county leadership refocused on its fundamental responsibilities: infrastructure and funding for public safety and social services."

Legislative career
As a state legislator, Carpenter currently serves on the Missouri House of Representatives' Administrative Oversight Committee, the General Laws Committee, and the Special Committee on Government Oversight, and serves as the Ranking Minority Member on the Professional Registration and Licensing Committee.

References

External links
 
Legislative website

Living people
Democratic Party members of the Missouri House of Representatives
Year of birth missing (living people)
University of Southern California alumni
Place of birth missing (living people)
21st-century American politicians